Prof. Dr. Yunis Haider Soomro was a Pakistani orthopaedic surgeon and former caretaker minister. He was the Minister for Housing and Works in Khoso caretaker ministry in 2013. He was known as an expert of the Russian Ilizarov limb-lengthening technique in orthopaedic surgery. He was a landlord and politician as well. Dr. Soomro was known for his philanthropy and charity work. 

He was the grandson of the former Chief Minister of Sindh Allah Bux Soomro.

He died on July 15, 2020, after contracting the COVID-19 virus.

References

Pakistani surgeons
Federal ministers of Pakistan
Younus
People from Shikarpur District
Year of birth missing
2020 deaths
Deaths from the COVID-19 pandemic in Sindh